The Fujian niltava (Niltava davidi) is a species of bird in the family Muscicapidae.
It is found in Cambodia, China, Hong Kong, Laos, Thailand, and Vietnam.
Its natural habitats are subtropical or tropical moist lowland forest and subtropical or tropical moist montane forest.

References

Fujian niltava
Birds of South China
Birds of Hainan
Birds of Yunnan
Fujian niltava
Taxonomy articles created by Polbot